Johnnie Mae Young (March 12, 1923 – January 14, 2014) was an American professional wrestler. She wrestled throughout the United States and Canada and won multiple titles in the National Wrestling Alliance. Young is considered one of the pioneers in women's wrestling as she helped to increase the popularity of the sport throughout the 1940s and during World War II. In 1954, she and Mildred Burke were among the first female competitors to tour post-war Japan.

Beginning in 1999, Young had a renewal success in her career after joining World Wrestling Federation (WWF, now WWE). Young was part of a recurring comedic duo with best friend The Fabulous Moolah in appearances on WWE televised events. Young is also remembered for taking bumps well past the age of 80 on televised programming. In 2004, she was inducted into the Professional Wrestling Hall of Fame and Museum as part of their "Lady Wrestler" category. On March 29, 2008, Young was inducted into the WWE Hall of Fame.

In 2017, an all-female professional wrestling tournament was introduced by WWE and was named Mae Young Classic as a tribute to her memory. Its purpose was to showcase the new female wrestlers that had signed with the company and were in development, as well as independent circuit veterans from around the world. The winner received a contract with WWE and a trophy for their achievement. After the second tournament in 2018, the tournament was discontinued.

Early life 
Johnnie Mae Young was born in Sand Springs, Oklahoma, on March 12, 1923. She was the youngest of eight children (one died at birth). Her mother Lilly Mae Young was a single mother (her partner left to find work and never returned) living during the Great Depression. Young's oldest sister Inie was severely disabled by whooping cough at a very young age. Young was an amateur wrestler on her high school's boys' wrestling team at the age of fifteen. Her brothers Fred, Eugen, Lawarence, and Everett taught her to wrestle and helped her join the team. Young also played softball with Tulsa's national championship team.

Professional wrestling career

Beginnings (1939–1950) 
While still in high school, Young went to a professional wrestling show and challenged then-champion Mildred Burke when she visited Tulsa to wrestle Gladys Gillem. Because the promoters told her she could not wrestle the champion, she wrestled Gillem in a shoot fight, beating her within seconds. After the fight, promoter Billy Wolfe wanted Young to become a professional wrestler. She left home two years later to wrestle professionally. Young later traveled to Charlotte, North Carolina, where she met and trained with The Fabulous Moolah and also met Ed "Strangler" Lewis who told her "I don't like girl wrestlers, women should be in the kitchen, but after seeing you, you was born to be a wrestler."

There have been conflicting reports as to the year in which Young began her career. Young claimed her first match was August 20, 1939, while WWE said she "started her professional career" this year. However, Young also once said her first match was March 22, 1940. According to Dave Meltzer of The Wrestling Observer, historians have been unable to find any records that she began in 1939 and that her first match was most likely in 1941. Meltzer wrote, "In reality, Young is believed to have competed in seven decades, matching the record held by Lou Thesz. ... You really couldn't call [her] 2010 match anything resembling a pro wrestling match, even giving as much leeway as possible. While she always claimed to have started in 1939, at 16, historians researching have been unable to find any records of her wrestling prior to 1941, when she turned 18 and went on tour with Billy Wolfe's troupe."

In 1941, Young, along with Mildred Burke, opened up Canada for female wrestling. In Canada, they worked for Stu Hart. She was wrestling in Memphis, Tennessee, on December 7, 1941, the day that Pearl Harbor was bombed by the Japanese, which led to the United States entering World War II. During the war, Young helped women take advantage of the fact that the men were fighting overseas by expanding their role in the sport.

Various wrestling promotions (1950–1970s) 

She fought under the nicknames of "The Queen" and "The Great Mae Young", but she used her real name for most of her matches. During the 1950s, she wrestled for Mildred Burke's World Women's Wrestling Association (WWWA). In 1954, Young and Burke were some of the first females to tour Japan after the war. In 1951, she became the National Wrestling Alliance's (NWA) first Florida Women's Champion. Five years later in September 1956, she participated in the battle royal to determine the new NWA World Women's Champion after June Byers was stripped of the title, but the championship was won by Young's friend The Fabulous Moolah. In 1968, she became the NWA's first United States Women's Champion.  She wrestled for WWWF in two matches in 1969 and 1972. At this point it is unknown when Mae left the wrestling business and retired. In the late 70s, Mae worked in the real estate business in San Leandro  California.

As an instructor, her students included Ric "The Equalizer" Drasin and The Fabulous Moolah.

Ladies International Wrestling Association (LIWA) (1993–1998) 
In 1993, Young would come out of retirement and started wrestling again for the first  time in over 20 years. She worked for Fabulous Moolah's Ladies International Wrestling Association based in Las Vegas. On June 21, 1996, she teamed with Fabulous Moolah at LIWA Golden Girls Extravaganza event in Las Vegas where they wrestled Liz Chase and Lori Lynn to a no contest. She continued working with LIWA and even teaming with Moolah until 1998. She left the promotion and went to the WWF in 1999.

World Wrestling Federation/Entertainment/WWE

Early appearance and arrival (1994, 1999–2001) 
Before her official recognition by WWE fans, she made a cameo appearance being shown by the camera along with The Fabulous Moolah, Freddie Blassie, Lou Albano, and Nikolai Volkoff in the crowd of the WrestleMania X event on March 20, 1994.

Young made her official debut in the World Wrestling Federation (WWF) on the September 9, 1999, episode of SmackDown!, where she was introduced with The Fabulous Moolah and later was attacked by Jeff Jarrett being put into the figure-four leglock. After this appearance, both Mae and Moolah began appearing regularly on WWF televised shows. Mae made her WWF in-ring debut on the September 27 episode of Raw is War; along with Moolah, she competed in a handicapped evening gown match  against WWF Women's Champion Ivory, who stripped Mae from her gown before Moolah picked up the victory. At No Mercy on October 17, Mae managed Moolah, who defeated Ivory for the championship – her last wrestling title before her death in 2007. At Survivor Series on November 14, she and Moolah competed in an eight-woman tag team match along with Debra and Tori against Ivory, Jacqueline, Terri Runnels, and Luna Vachon, with their team coming out victorious.

At the Royal Rumble event on January 23, 2000, Mae Young won the Miss Royal Rumble 2000 swimsuit contest and afterwards flashed her breasts. However, she was actually wearing a prosthesis and did not actually expose herself. At the end of 1999 and through 2000, Mae developed a storyline along with "Sexual Chocolate" Mark Henry where she started dating him, which included a kayfabe pregnancy and attacks by The Dudley Boyz, specifically Bubba Ray Dudley who performed powerbombs on Young through tables twice in consecutive episodes of Raw – the first being in the ring and the second, in which Young was originally reliant on a wheelchair, being off the entryway stage as what has been described as the most notorious powerbomb in WWE history. Mae was 77 years of age at the time, but expressed enthusiasm for the stunt. Her child was eventually delivered and found to be nothing more than a bloody rubber hand. On April 2, Mae accompanied The Kat at WrestleMania 2000 to her match against Terri Runnels; Kat lost the match as Mae was distracted by kissing the guest referee, Val Venis, before attacking Terri and her manager, Moolah.

On December 24, 2001, Young and Moolah appeared backstage on the Christmas Eve edition of Raw, which marked their last appearance before returning in the summer of 2002.

Return and sporadic appearances (2002–2007) 
On the July 29, 2002, episode of Raw, Mae Young returned along with Moolah, to promote her new book: "The Fabulous Moolah: First Goddess of the Squared Circle" before being attacked by 3-Minute Warning on orders of general manager Eric Bischoff. On the September 15, 2003, episode of Raw, she accompanied Moolah at her last wrestling singles match, in which she defeated Victoria before being attacked by Randy Orton and an infuriated Victoria. On June 15 at Bad Blood, Mae appeared during a segment along with Stone Cold Steve Austin and Eric Bischoff where she stripped herself in the ring and performed a bronco buster on Bischoff before being stunned by Austin.

In 2004, Mae Young was inducted into the Professional Wrestling Hall of Fame and Museum as part of their Lady wrestler category class of that year. On the September 23 episode of SmackDown!, Young teamed with Moolah and defeated Dawn Marie and Torrie Wilson.

On March 23, 2005, Moolah and Mae Young appeared on the Late Night with Conan O'Brien show to promote their 2005 documentary in which they starred in an about their 1950s heyday along with several other lady wrestlers of their era. On January 8, 2006, at New Year's Revolution, Young re−appeared along with Moolah during a bra & panties gauntlet match where she stripped herself before being attacked by Victoria as she left the ring, which led to both women retaliate and rip off Victoria's shirt. At WrestleMania 22 on April 2, Young appeared along with Moolah during a backstage segment with Snitsky.

At WrestleMania 23 on April 1, 2007, Mae Young appeared during a backstage segment along with several other WWE superstars and hall of famers. On the August 24 episode of SmackDown, Mae Young made a special appearance winning a Divas bikini contest. Mae's last appearance with Moolah before her death came at SummerSlam in August 2007, both appeared during a backstage segment along with Vince McMahon and Raw's general manager, William Regal, two months prior to her friend's death.

WWE Hall of Fame, retirement and final appearances (2008–2013) 
On March 29, 2008, Young was inducted into the WWE Hall of Fame as part of the 2008 class. At the ceremony, she was inducted by fellow wrestler and friend, Pat Patterson. The next night at WrestleMania XXIV, she appeared when she was introduced as part of the 2008 Hall of Fame class. On the 800th episode of Raw on November 3, Mae Young competed in a 16-Diva tag match, where she was pinned by Beth Phoenix.

At WrestleMania XXV on April 5, 2009, Mae Young appeared as the special guest time keeper for the 25-Diva battle royal, which was won by Santina Marella.

On the November 15, 2010, "Old School" edition of Raw, Mae Young won a Falls Count Anywhere handicap match against LayCool, thus becoming the first person ever to wrestle over the age of 80, the first person to wrestle in nine different decades and her final stipulated wrestling match.

At WrestleMania XXVII on April 3, 2011, Mae appeared backstage during a segment along with The Rock and Eve Torres. During the May 2 episode of Raw, Vickie Guerrero and Dolph Ziggler mockingly presented Mae was a "birthday gift" to The Rock, who responded by kissing Young.

Mae Young appeared on SmackDown: Blast from the Past (April 10, 2012), kissing The Great Khali. and Raw 1000 (July 23, 2012), during which she was escorted by a man dressed in a giant hand costume, claiming to be her son. On September 24 episode of Raw, Mae appeared in one of Kane and Daniel Bryan's "Anger Management" skits. On the December 31 episode of Raw, Mae Young was warming up for her match with then-Divas Champion Eve Torres and began experiencing stomach cramps as it was later determined that she was once again pregnant and gave birth to "Baby New Year", played by Hornswoggle.

In her last on-screen appearance on the March 4, 2013, episode of Old School Raw, Mae Young's 90th birthday celebration was interrupted by CM Punk. Backstage, WWE Chairman Vince McMahon and WWE executive Triple H presented her with a personally monogrammed Divas Championship belt.

Professional wrestling persona 
Little is known about Young's character before WWE, but she is remembered in WWE for her comedic performances. Among her finishing and signature moves included the elbow drop and the bronco buster, in which she used to performed the famous D-Generation X crotch chop taunt. Young is also remembered for taking bumps, one of her most famous spots was being powerbombed through a table off the wrestling arena stage by Bubba Ray Dudley at the age of 77. Another famous bump of hers was when she was attacked along with The Fabulous Moolah by 3-Minute Warning, where she was scoop slammed and diving splashed by Rosey and Jamal at the age of 79.

Other media

Video games 
Young appeared in one WWE video game, being this at the WWF No Mercy as an unlockable character, and was also featured on the mobile game for iOS and Android, WWE SuperCard.

Toys 
In 2007, Mae Young was appeared on Jakks Pacific WWE Classic Superstars Series 18. On September 12, 2017, WWE unveiled an exclusive fashion doll done by toy brand Mattel of Mae Young.

In November 2020, a Mae Young action figure was included in the Mattel WWE Elite 81 series as a rare exclusive collector's one.

Personal life 
As a sign of friendship for meeting her longtime friend The Fabulous Moolah, she called her "Lilian" while Moolah referred to her by Young. In 1991, Young quit the wrestling business and moved to California to become a Christian evangelist and take care of her mother, who was sick. She later renounced her evangelist lifestyle. In 1991, she moved in with The Fabulous Moolah and midget wrestler Katie Glass at a house in Columbia, South Carolina, an arrangement which lasted until Moolah's death in November 2007.

Death 

On December 31, 2013, it was reported that Young had been hospitalized. The Charleston Post & Courier erroneously reported that she had died on January 9, 2014. Young's death was announced by the WWE on the morning of January 14 after having died at her home in Columbia, South Carolina. Young was entombed at Greenlawn Memorial Park in Columbia, South Carolina, the same cemetery where her longtime friend The Fabulous Moolah also rests.

Legacy

Mae Young Classic 

On April 1st, 2017, WWE announced that a women's tournament would be taking place in the summer of 2017 at a press conference during the WrestleMania 33 weekend and that there were going to be a total of 32 wrestlers competing.

The tournament was named after Young as an honor to her and it was exclusively for women from both NXT and the independent circuit, it took place on July 13th and 14th, 2017, which aired on the WWE Network on August 28 (round 1) and September 4 (round 2, quarterfinals, and semifinals), and the final match aired live on September 12, also on the WWE Network. The finalists of the inaugural tournament were Shayna Baszler and Kairi Sane, with the winner being Sane on September 12.

In 2018, the tournament turned annual as it was announced a second event for the Mae Young Classic. The winner of the 2018 tournament was Toni Storm on October 28, and she was crowned at the first ever all women's pay–per–view WWE Evolution.

Posthumous honors 
On January 14, 2014, the exact day of Mae's death, WWE pay tribute to her with a posthumous video which included highlights of her career, and another one six days later on January 20. On January 16, Total Nonstop Action Wrestling dedicated their live Genesis episode of Impact Wrestling to the memory of Young. On January 17, SmackDown was also dedicated to her memory. Two weeks later, Shine 16 dedicated to her a ten-bell salute.

On March 20th, 2017, WWE honored Young during their Women's History Month, a video was released where she was credited as the women pioneer of professional wrestling. WWE praised for her contributions to the wrestling business by Stephanie McMahon, the late Fabulous Moolah, Ivory, Beth Phoenix and Pat Patterson. On July 30, multiple superstars from the Mae Young Classic recognized and honored Mae's legacy and life, among them Lita, Jim Ross, Lacey Evans, Mercedes Martinez, Bianca Belair, Marti Belle and Vanessa Borne.

Filmography

Film

Television

Championships and accomplishments 

 Championship Wrestling from Florida
 NWA Florida Women's Championship (1 time)
 National Wrestling Alliance
 NWA United States Women's Championship (1 time)
 NWA World Women's Tag Team Championship (1 time) – with Ella Waldek
 Pro Wrestling Illustrated
 Ranked No. 241 of the top 500 wrestlers in the PWI 500 in 2006
 Professional Wrestling Hall of Fame
 Class of 2004
 World Wrestling Federation/World Wrestling Entertainment/WWE
 Miss Royal Rumble (1 time)
 Slammy Award (1 time)
 Knucklehead Moment of the Year (2010) 
 WWE Hall of Fame (Class of 2008)
 Other titles
 California Women's Championship (2 times)

See also 
 List of oldest surviving professional wrestlers

Notes

References

External links 

 
 
 

1923 births
2014 deaths
American female professional wrestlers
Professional wrestlers from South Carolina
Professional Wrestling Hall of Fame and Museum
Professional wrestling trainers
Sportspeople from Tulsa, Oklahoma
WWE Hall of Fame inductees
Stampede Wrestling alumni
Professional wrestlers from Oklahoma
21st-century American women
20th-century professional wrestlers
21st-century professional wrestlers